Beatenberg is a South African band based in Cape Town, composed of Matthew Field, Robin Brink, and Ross Dorkin. The group signed with Universal Music Group label in 2012. They gained national attention in 2014 from their collaboration with the artist DJ Clock with "Pluto (Remember You)", which became the number one popular song on South African radio for over 19 consecutive weeks.

Their second album The Hanging Gardens of Beatenberg (2014), generated hit singles including "Beauty Like a Tightened Bow", "Scorpionfish", and "Pluto (Remember You)". Their third album 12 Views of Beatenberg (2018), after the release of singles "Camera", "Ode to the Berg Wind" and "Aphrodite", in collaboration with the singer Tresor.

Band members
Matthew Field (vocals, guitar)
Robin Brink (drums)
Ross Dorkin (bass, keys)

Discography

Albums
 Farm Photos (2009) 
 The Hanging Gardens of Beatenberg (2014)
 12 Views of Beatenberg (2018)
 On the way to Beatenberg EP (2022)

Singles
"Echoes" (2012)
"Chelsea Blakemore" (2013)
"Pluto (Remember You)" (2013)
"Rafael" (2014)
"Camera" (2018)
"Ode to the Berg Wind" (2018)
"Aphrodite" (2018)

Music videos
 "Pluto (Remember You)"
 "Chelsea Blakemore"
 "Rafael"
 "Southern Suburbs"
 "Beauty Like A Tightened Bow"
 "Camera"
 "Ode to the Berg Wind"
 "Aphrodite" feat. TRESOR
 "Stamina"

Awards and nominations

References

External links
Beatenberg Website

South African pop music groups
Musical groups established in 2008
Worldbeat groups